Robin Hood's Golden Prize is Child ballad 147. It is a story in the Robin Hood canon which has survived as, among other forms, a late seventeenth-century English broadside ballad, and is one of several ballads about the medieval folk hero that form part of the Child ballad collection, which is one of the most comprehensive collections of traditional English ballads.

Synopsis
Robin Hood disguises himself as a friar in the forest and encounters two "lusty" priests on horseback (4.4). He begs the priests for a silver groat, saying he hasn't been able to get anything to eat or drink all day. The priests explain that they have no money because they have been robbed that morning. Robin tells them he thinks they're lying, and at that they speed away on their horses, but Robin soon catches up with them. He pulls them off of their horses, whereupon the priests fall on their knees and promise to pray for money. After they've prayed for an hour, Robin says they will all search themselves for the money heaven has given them. The priests pretend to search themselves and still find no money, but when Robin searches them he finds five hundred pieces of gold, which he lays out on the ground. He gives them each fifty pounds for praying so earnestly and keeps the rest for himself.

Relieved to get away physically unharmed, the priests rise from their knees to go, but Robin commands them to stay until they have taken three oaths by the forest's "holy grass": that they never again will lie, that they will never try to persuade maidens to sin or lie with other men's wives, and that they will be charitable to the poor (21.3). The priests go on their way and Robin returns to the forest.

Adaptations
Howard Pyle altered this to a tale about Little John in his The Merry Adventures of Robin Hood.

See also
List of the Child Ballads

References

Bibliography

External links
 Link to a facsimile sheet of an early modern version of this ballad at the English Broadside Ballad Archive at the University of California, Santa Barbara: 
Robin Hood’s Golden Prize
Robin Hood’s Golden Prize
Robin Hood’s Golden Prize
 Link to the website of The Robin Hood Project, a collection of webpages chronicling the development of Robin Hood from his medieval origins to modern depictions, at the Robbins Library at the University of Rochester: 
 Link to a fairly comprehensive website on all things Robin Hood, including historical background on the real Robin Hood and other characters of the legend, texts and recordings of Robin Hood stories, resources for teachers and students, information about adaptations, and more: 

Child Ballads
Robin Hood ballads